{{hatnote|1=Not to be confused with a stationary point where {{math|1=f(x) = 0}}, or with fixed-point arithmetic, a form of limited-precision arithmetic in computing.}}
A fixed point (sometimes shortened to fixpoint, also known as an invariant point) is a value that does not change under a given transformation. Specifically, in mathematics, a fixed point of a function is an element that is mapped to itself by the function.

In physics, the term fixed point can refer to a temperature that can be used as a reproducible reference point, usually defined by a phase change or triple point.

 Fixed point of a function 

For example, if  is defined on the real numbers by

In graphical terms, a fixed point  means the point  is on the line , or in other words the graph of  has a point in common with that line.

 Fixed-point iteration 

In numerical analysis, fixed-point iteration is a method of computing fixed points of a function.

which gives rise to the sequence  of iterated function applications  which is hoped to converge to a point .

Points that come back to the same value after a finite number of iterations of the function are called periodic points. A fixed point is a periodic point with period equal to one.

 Fixed point of a group action 

In algebra, for a group G acting on a set X with a group action , x in X is said to be a fixed point of g if .

The fixed-point subgroup  of an automorphism f of a group G is the subgroup of G:

Similarly the fixed-point subring  of an automorphism f of a ring R is the subring of the fixed points of f, that is,

In Galois theory, the set of the fixed points of a set of field automorphisms is a field called the fixed field of the set of automorphisms.

Topological fixed point property

A topological space  is said to have the fixed point property (FPP) if for any continuous function

there exists  such that .

The FPP is a topological invariant, i.e. is preserved by any homeomorphism. The FPP is also preserved by any retraction.

According to the Brouwer fixed-point theorem, every compact and convex subset of a Euclidean space has the FPP. Compactness alone does not imply the FPP and convexity is not even a topological property so it makes sense to ask how to topologically characterize the FPP. In 1932 Borsuk asked whether compactness together with contractibility could be a necessary and sufficient condition for the FPP to hold. The problem was open for 20 years until the conjecture was disproved by Kinoshita who found an example of a compact contractible space without the FPP.

Fixed points of partial orders 

In domain theory, the notion and terminology of fixed points is generalized to a partial order. Let ≤ be a partial order over a set X and let f: X → X be a function over X. Then a prefixed point (also spelled pre-fixed point, sometimes shortened to prefixpoint or pre-fixpoint) of f is any p such that f(p) ≤ p. Analogously, a postfixed point  of f is any p such that p ≤ f(p).  The opposite usage occasionally appears. A fixed point is a point that is both a prefixpoint and a postfixpoint. Prefixpoints and postfixpoints have applications in theoretical computer science.

 Least fixed point 

In order theory, the least fixed point of a function from a partially ordered set (poset) to itself is the fixed point which is less than each other fixed point, according to the order of the poset. A function need not have a least fixed point, but if it does then the least fixed point is unique.

One way to express the Knaster–Tarski theorem is to say that a monotone function on a complete lattice has a least fixpoint that coincides with its least prefixpoint (and similarly its greatest fixpoint coincides with its greatest postfixpoint).

Fixed-point combinator

In combinatory logic for computer science, a fixed-point combinator is a higher-order function  that returns a fixed point of its argument function, if one exists. Formally, if the function f has one or more fixed points, then
 

Fixed-point logics

In mathematical logic, fixed-point logics are extensions of classical predicate logic that have been introduced to express recursion. Their development has been motivated by descriptive complexity theory and their relationship to database query languages, in particular to Datalog.

Fixed-point theorems

A fixed-point theorem is a result saying that at least one fixed point exists, under some general condition. Some authors claim that results of this kind are amongst the most generally useful in mathematics.

Applications

In many fields, equilibria or stability are fundamental concepts that can be described in terms of fixed points.  Some examples follow.

  In projective geometry, a fixed point of a projectivity has been called a double point'''.G. B. Halsted (1906) Synthetic Projective Geometry, page 27
 In economics, a Nash equilibrium of a game is a fixed point of the game's best response correspondence. John Nash exploited the Kakutani fixed-point theorem for his seminal paper that won him the Nobel prize in economics.
 In physics, more precisely in the theory of phase transitions, linearisation near an unstable fixed point has led to  Wilson's Nobel prize-winning work inventing the renormalization group, and to the mathematical explanation  of the term "critical phenomenon."
 Programming language compilers use fixed point computations for program analysis, for example in data-flow analysis, which is often required for code optimization. They are also the core concept used by the generic program analysis method abstract interpretation.
 In type theory, the fixed-point combinator allows definition of recursive functions in the untyped lambda calculus.
 The vector of PageRank values of all web pages is the fixed point of a linear transformation derived from the World Wide Web's link structure.
 The stationary distribution of a Markov chain is the fixed point of the one step transition probability function.
 Logician Saul Kripke makes use of fixed points in his influential theory of truth.  He shows how one can generate a partially defined truth predicate (one that remains undefined for problematic sentences like "This sentence is not true"), by recursively defining "truth" starting from the segment of a language that contains no occurrences of the word, and continuing until the process ceases to yield any newly well-defined sentences. (This takes a countable infinity of steps.) That is, for a language L, let L′ (read "L-prime") be the language generated by adding to L, for each sentence S in L, the sentence "S is true."  A fixed point is reached when L′ is L; at this point sentences like "This sentence is not true" remain undefined, so, according to Kripke, the theory is suitable for a natural language that contains its own'' truth predicate.

See also

Cycles and fixed points of permutations
Eigenvector
Equilibrium
Fixed points of a Möbius transformation
Idempotence
Infinite compositions of analytic functions
Invariant (mathematics)

Notes

External links
 An Elegant Solution for Drawing a Fixed Point

 
Game theory